Sign of Moe Pan Pwint is a 2018 Burmese drama film starring Han Lin Thant, May Myint Mo and Chue Lay. The film, produced by Niyyayana Production premiered in Myanmar on September 14, 2018.

Cast
May Myint Mo as Moe Pan Pwint
Yan Aung as U Ko Ko Htun, Moe Pan Pwint's father
Soe Myat Thuzar as Daw Khin Moe Thwe
Han Lin Thant as Aww Zar
Ye Aung as U Aung Ye Naing, Aww Zar's father
War War Aung as Daw Kay Thi, Aww Zar's mother
Chue Lay as Cho Myain
May Thinzar Oo as Daw May Oo, Cho Myain's mother

Awards & Nominations

References

External links

2018 films
2010s Burmese-language films
Burmese drama films
Films shot in Myanmar
2018 drama films